The Search Bloc is the name of three different ad hoc special operations units of the National Police of Colombia (Policía Nacional de Colombia). They were originally organized with a focus on capturing or killing highly dangerous individuals or groups of individuals.

First Search Bloc
The original Search Bloc was created in 1986 by President Virgilio Barco with the sole objective of apprehending drug lord Pablo Escobar and his associates. Its original commander was Colonel Hugo Martinez.

Search Bloc members received training from the Colombian army and were specially selected to be impervious to police corruption from the drug cartels. Throughout its mission, Search Bloc faced many obstacles, including a spy within the group. There were claims that the Search Bloc collaborated with anti-Escobar vigilante groups such as Los Pepes, including vigilantism in the suspicious deaths of Escobar's subordinates.

Escobar was killed on December 2, 1993, in a shootout with members of the Search Bloc.

After dismantling the Medellín Cartel, the Search Bloc was transferred to Cali to locate and shut down the Cali Cartel.

Second Search Bloc
The Search Bloc was revived in 2004 to root out cocaine and heroin traffickers in southwest Colombia. The new Search Bloc was tasked with taking apart the Norte del Valle cartel and arresting its leader, Diego León Montoya Sánchez, which it did successfully in 2007.

Third Search Bloc
In 2007, the Colombian government again ordered the creation of a new Search Bloc against the Águilas Negras, or Black Eagles, classified as a gang of former paramilitaries.

In popular culture
The original Search Bloc was featured prominently in the Netflix original series Narcos, which portrays the rise and fall of Pablo Escobar. In the series, the Search Bloc is headed by a character named Colonel Horacio Carrillo, who critics have claimed is loosely based on Colonel Hugo Martinez; however, Martinez is introduced as a separate character in Season 2.

The Search Bloc was also the subject of a Colombian miniseries named Bloque de Busqueda, the Spanish translation of Search Bloc. The show was broadcast in the United States by Univision's sister network, UniMás.

See also
Pablo Escobar
La Catedral
Los Pepes

References

External links 
 Mark Bowden, Killing Pablo (a copy of Bowden's serial articles in The Philadelphia Inquirer is available here)
 Jane's Jane's Terrorism & Security Monitor March 01, 2004

1992 establishments in Colombia
Manhunts
Medellín Cartel
National Police of Colombia